Matthew Poole (born 22 October 1990) is an English professional footballer who plays as a midfielder for Kendal Town.

Career
Born in Lancaster, Poole made his professional debut for Morecambe on 11 August 2009 in a Football League Cup match against Preston North End. Poole was released by Morecambe at the end of the 2009-10 season, and he later signed for non-league Lancaster City, making his debut for them in August 2010. He also spent time with Kendal Town.

References

Living people
English footballers
Morecambe F.C. players
Lancaster City F.C. players
1990 births
Association football midfielders
Kendal Town F.C. players